Jasleen Singh Saini (born 10 October 1997) is an Indian judoka who competes in the 66 kg weight class.

References

External links 

Living people
1997 births
Indian male judoka
People from Gurdaspur
Indian male martial artists
Martial artists from Punjab, India
Judoka at the 2022 Commonwealth Games
Commonwealth Games competitors for India
21st-century Indian people